North Brunswick High School is a public school located in Leland, North Carolina It is one of five high schools in the Brunswick County Schools district. As of the 2016–17 school year, North Brunswick has 1300 students currently enrolled in grades 9 through 12.

Extracurricular activities

Sports 
Football: Varsity and Junior Varsity
Men's Soccer: Varsity and Junior Varsity
Women's Soccer: Varsity
Volleyball: Varsity and Junior Varsity
Cheerleading: Varsity and Junior Varsity
Men's Basketball: Varsity and Junior Varsity
Women's Basketball: Varsity
Cross Country
Wrestling: Varsity and Junior Varsity
Baseball: Varsity and Junior Varsity
Softball: Varsity and Junior Varsity
Track and Field 
Men's and Women's Golf

Clubs and societies 
The school has a wide range of clubs and societies including Science Olympiad, Dance Team, National Honor Society, French Honor Society, Show Choir, After School Chorus, Marching Band, Army JROTC, Anime Club, Journalism, and a Drama Department.

Marching band 
The North Brunswick High School Marching Band, known as the NBHS Marching Scorps, is directed by Patrick Barrett and is celebrated through the town of Leland. In 2011, the band performed in the National 4 July festival in Washington, DC. In 2019, the band was chosen by Senator Thom Tillis to play in the 4th of July Parade in Washington, D.C.

Notable alumni 
 Chucky Brown, NBA player and 1995 NBA champion with the Houston Rockets
 Percy Watson, former professional wrestler and WWE commentator

References

External links 
  Official School Site
 Official District Site
 Official Band Site

Schools in Brunswick County, North Carolina
Public high schools in North Carolina